Plusia venusta, the white-streaked looper, is a species of looper moth in the family Noctuidae. It is found in North America.

The MONA or Hodges number for Plusia venusta is 8953.

References

Further reading

External links

 

Plusiini
Articles created by Qbugbot
Moths described in 1865